Valerie Rawlston Wilson is an American economist who directs the Economic Policy Institute’s Program on Race, Ethnicity, and the Economy (PREE). She was previously vice president of research at the National Urban League Washington Bureau. She researches and writes about economic inequality in the United States in employment and training, income and wealth disparities, access to higher education, and social insurance. She has testified before the United States Congressional Committee on Education and Labor on How COVID-19 Widened Racial Inequities in Education, Health, and the Workforce. She is the 2022 president of the National Economic Association.

Selected works 

 Wilson, Valerie Rawlston. "The effect of attending an HBCU on persistence and graduation outcomes of African-American college students." The Review of Black Political Economy 34, no. 1-2 (2007): 11–52.
 Rawlston-Wilson, Valerie, Susie Saavedra, and Shree Chauhan. "From access to completion: A seamless path to college graduation for African American students." (2014).
 Wilson, Valerie Rawlston, and Renee R. Hanson. "Effective policies for promoting early behavioral development." Harvard Journal Of African American Public Policy (2009): 1555–66.
 Gould, Elise Lorraine, and Valerie Rawlston-Wilson. Black Workers Face Two of the Most Lethal Preexisting Conditions for Coronavirus—racism and Economic Inequality: Report. Economic Policy Institute, 2020.
 WILSON, VALERIE RAWLSTON. "African Americans & the Green Revolution: A Report from the National Urban League Policy Institute."

References 

African-American economists
Hampton University alumni
American women economists
Living people
Labor economists
University of North Carolina at Chapel Hill alumni
Year of birth missing (living people)
Presidents of the National Economic Association
21st-century African-American people
21st-century African-American women